Undeniable (stylized as Unden!able) is the fifth studio album from American heavy metal band Hellyeah. The cover of Phil Collins' "I Don't Care Anymore" features guitar parts from late Pantera member Dimebag Darrell.

Track listing

Personnel 
Chad Gray – vocals
Tom Maxwell – rhythm guitar
Christian Brady – lead guitar
Kyle Sanders – bass
Vinnie Paul – drums

Additional personnel
Dimebag Darrell – lead guitar on "I Don't Care Anymore"

Charts

References

2016 albums
Hellyeah albums
Eleven Seven Label Group albums